is a neighbourhood around the area of Nagoya Station, today a part of Nakamura-ku, Nagoya, central Japan. 

Sasashima ware used to be produced there during the late Edo period. 

It is served by the Sasashima-raibu Station.